The Souvenirs du château is a small, five-piece piano solo collection composed by Eugénie R. Rocherolle that embodies the memories shared by her family, friends, and ancestors at the Château de la Rocherolle, a medieval family castle located in the heart of France. The entire work is lovingly dedicated to Guy and Monique Rocherolle.

The five pieces
 Une matinée au lavoir (A Morning at the Laundry Basin) portrays several women scrubbing away, stopping at intervals to engage in light conversation or the gossip of the day.
 La chapelle (The Chapel) is the site of a number of family weddings. It speaks of reverence and romance.
 Déjeuner dans la cour (Luncheon in the Courtyard) captures the conviviality of shared moments around the table.
 Le donjon (The Dungeon) is a dramatic setting of the despondency of all those detained in its darkness.
 Le salon de musique (The Music Room) is a reminiscence of a more elegant time.

References 

Compositions for solo piano